Zvi Hercowitz  (born December 21, 1945 in Rosario, Argentina) is professor emeritus at Tel Aviv University's School of Economics and has been a member of the montetary committee of the Bank of Israel since 2017.

He emigrated to Israel in 1969 and began his academic career at Tel Aviv University in 1980. He published extensively throughout his career, with notable works includingMoney and the Dispersion of Relative Prices", Journal of Political Economy, April 1981; "Output Growth, the Real Wage, and Employment Fluctuations" with Michael Sampson, American Economic Review, December 1991; and "Long-Run Implications of Investment-Specific Technological Progress" with Jeremy Greenwood and Per Krusell, American Economic Review, June 1997.

He received the bachelor's degree in economics in 1973 and the master of arts in economics in 1975, both from the Hebrew University in Jerusalem. In 1980 he received his PhD in economics from the University of Rochester with his dissertation supervised by Robert Barro.

References

Academic staff of Tel Aviv University
Israeli economists